Abiodun Adesola "Abi" Oyepitan (born 30 December 1979) is a British sprint athlete, who specialises in the 100 and 200 metres. She won the 100 m at the 2001 Summer Universiade and at the 2002 Commonwealth Games she took a bronze medal with the 4 × 100 m team. She became one of Britain's best female sprinters, becoming the first British female to reach an Olympic final in a sprint event since Kathy Cook. However, following her performance in the 2004 Athens Olympics, she suffered an injury, which all but brought her career to a halt.She made a winning comeback in 2010, competing in the Diamond League and winning a silver medal for England at the Commonwealth Games in Delhi in the 200 m and a gold medal when she anchored the 4 × 100 m relay team to a win.

Early career
Abi was born in Westminster, London to Nigerian parents. Her name "Adesola" means "crowned with wealth" in Yoruba. She attended Bentley Wood High School. She represents Shaftesbury Barnet Harriers athletics club. Her first outing to a major athletics came at the 1998 World Junior Athletics Championships, where she finished fourth as part of the British 4 x 100 m relay team. She continued to perform well at the junior level, but her progress was interrupted in 2000 by an injury. She managed to bounce back the following year, with her comeback including a silver medal at the European under-23 Championships.

She was again part of the 4 x 100 m relay squad at the 2001 World Championships. Although the squad came away empty handed, they set the second fastest time ever by a British squad. She went on to take gold at the World Student Games that same year.

2002 saw Abi make the final of the Commonwealth Games 100 m and improve on this in the relay by taking silver behind an Australian team. She also made the final of the European Athletics Championships, where Ekaterini Thanou took the gold.

She continued to improve and in 2003 broke her 200 m personal best in taking her first national senior title.

2004 saw Abi step up to hold her own with the best in the world. At a meeting in Kalamata, Greece, in May she won the 100 m, then beat the reigning European Champion Muriel Hurtis in the 200 m.

2004 Athens Olympics
At the 2004 Summer Olympics Abi was unfortunate in not making the 100 m final. Running in the faster of the two semi-finals, she finished fifth in her heat with a time of 11.18 s, that equalled LaTasha Colander's fourth placed time that saw her through in the second semi.

Despite not making that final, her good form gave her confidence for her preferred event the 200 m where she set a personal best in the first round, then comfortably progressed through round two and the semi-final, finishing second in both to Allyson Felix. She was passed early on in the final by eventual winner Veronica Campbell and eventually finished joint 7th, but happy with her overall performance.

Her appearance in the 200 m final was the first women's Olympic sprint final (100 + 200 m) to feature a Brit since Kathy Smallwood-Cook at the Los Angeles Olympics twenty years previously. She was also the only Briton to reach the sprint finals, all of the men failing for the first time in twenty-eight years, despite later going on to win the 4 × 100 m relay.

After 2004
Following the Olympics, a stress fracture injury caused her to miss the 2005 athletics season. She returned to the track in 2006, but the injury continued to limit her performances.

In 2010, she returned to take silver in the 200 m and a gold in the 4 x 100 m relay at the Commonwealth Games in Delhi.

2012 London Olympics 
In 2012, Abi came 2nd in the Oslo leg of the Diamond League 200 m Women in 22.71s. She then qualified for 2012 Olympics in London, where she competed in the 100 m and 200 m, making the semi-finals in both events.

In 2014, she announced her retirement.

National titles
AAAs (of England) National 100 metres Champion – 2004 (2nd in 2002, 2003)
AAAs National 200 metres Champion – 2003 (2nd in 2004)

International competitions

Personal bests

All information taken from IAAF profile.

References

External links
 
 
 
  (archive)
 

1979 births
Living people
People from Westminster
Athletes from London
English female sprinters
British female sprinters
Olympic female sprinters
Olympic athletes of Great Britain
Athletes (track and field) at the 2004 Summer Olympics
Athletes (track and field) at the 2012 Summer Olympics
Commonwealth Games gold medallists for England
Commonwealth Games silver medallists for England
Commonwealth Games bronze medallists for England
Commonwealth Games gold medallists in athletics
Commonwealth Games medallists in athletics
Athletes (track and field) at the 2002 Commonwealth Games
Athletes (track and field) at the 2010 Commonwealth Games
Universiade medalists in athletics (track and field)
Universiade gold medalists for Great Britain
Medalists at the 2001 Summer Universiade
World Athletics Championships athletes for Great Britain
British Athletics Championships winners
AAA Championships winners
Black British sportswomen
English people of Nigerian descent
People educated at Bentley Wood High School
Alumni of Brunel University London
English people of Yoruba descent
Medallists at the 2002 Commonwealth Games
Medallists at the 2010 Commonwealth Games